Lješnica may refer to:

Lješnica (Derventa) near Derventa, Bosnia and Herzegovina
Lješnica (Tuzla) near Tuzla, Bosnia and Herzegovina
Lješnica, Bijelo Polje, Montenegro
Lješnica, Petnjica, Montenegro
Lješnica (Serbia) near in Kučevo, Serbia